N.Y. Hanumanthappa (born 25 September 1939) was a member of the 14th Lok Sabha of India. He represented the Chitradurga constituency of Karnataka and is a member of the Indian National Congress (INC) political party.

Before his election to the Lok Sabha, Hanumanthappa served as chief justice of the Orissa High Court, having previously served on the High Courts of Karnataka and Andhra Pradesh.

Hanumanthappa unsuccessfully contested 2014 Loksabha election from Bellary constituency in Karnataka.

References

External links
 Home Page on the Parliament of India's Website

1939 births
Indian National Congress politicians from Karnataka
Living people
India MPs 2004–2009
People from Chitradurga
Lok Sabha members from Karnataka